Hauksbók ('Book of Haukr'), Reykjavík, Stofnun Árna Magnússonar AM 371 4to, AM 544 4to and AM 675 4to, is an Icelandic  manuscript, now in three parts but originally one, dating from the 14th century. It was created by the Icelander Haukr Erlendsson. It is now fragmentary, with significant portions being lost, but is the first surviving witness to many of the texts it contains (although in most cases Haukr is known to have been copying from earlier, lost manuscripts). Among these are the section on mathematics called Algorismus

and the text of Hervarar saga ok Heiðreks.

Composition
Hauksbók is associated with an Icelandic lawspeaker named Haukr Erlendsson: although the work of several scribes, the vast majority is in Haukr's hand. Palaeographical evidence allowed Professor Stefán Karlsson, director of the Árni Magnússon Institute for Icelandic Studies, to date the manuscript to between 1302 and 1310. As long back as it is possible to trace the manuscript it has been called Hauksbók after him. Hauksbók is a compilation that includes Icelandic sagas and a redaction of Landnámabók. The book contains versions, often the only or earliest extant versions, of many Old Icelandic texts, such as Fóstbrœðra saga, Eiríks saga rauða, Hervarar saga and Völuspá. Haukr tended to rewrite the sagas that he copied, generally shortening them.

In addition, Haukr Erlendsson wrote "Hauk's Annals," which chronicled events of his lifetime and a handbook on Norse law.

Contents
The known contents of Hauksbók are:

AM 371 4to
 (1r-14v): Landnámabók
 (15r-18v): Kristni saga

AM 544 4to
 (1r-14v): encyclopaedic information drawn from various sources, on geography, natural phenomena, and Biblical stories
 (15r-19v): encyclopaedic information drawn from various sources, on philosophy and theology
 (20r-21r): Völuspá
 (22r-33v): Trójumanna saga
 (34r): a text called 'Seven Precious Stones And Their Nature'
 (35v): Cisiojanus (a versified Latin enumeration for remembering the church festivals throughout the year)
 (36r-59r): Breta sögur, including Merlínússpá
 (60r-68v): two dialogues between the soul and the body
 (69r-72v:9): Hemings þáttr Áslákssonar
 (72v:9-76v): Hervarar saga ok Heiðreks
 (77r-89v:35): Fóstbrœðra saga
 (89v:35-93r:17): Algorismus
 (93r:17-101v:24): Eiríks saga rauða
 (101v:25-104v:17): Skálda saga
 (104v:18-105r:21): Af Upplendinga konungum
 (105r:21-107v): Ragnarssona þáttr
 (107v): Prognostica Temporum

AM 675 4to
 Elucidarius

Editions
Hauksbók is often included as a witness in editions of the individual sagas that it contains. It has been edited as whole in the following:
 Hauksbók, udg. efter de Arnamagnæanske håndskrifter no. 371, 544 og 675, 4̊, samt forskellige papirshåndskrifter af det Kongelige nordiske oldskrift-selskab, ed. by Finnur Jónsson and Eiríkur Jónsson (København: Thiele, 1892–96)
 Hauksbók: The Arna-Magnæan Manuscripts, 371, 4to, 544, 4to, and 675, 4to., ed. by Jón Helgason, Manuscripta Islandica, 5 (Copenhagen: Munksgaard, 1960) [facsimile]

References

External links
 Main entry at handrit.is
 Algorismus in Hauksbok by Otto B. Bekken, Marit A. Nielsen and Steinar Thorvaldsen. A translation into modern Norwegian. Eureka Digital, 2010.
 Sverrir Jakobsson. Hauksbók and Construction of an Icelandic World VIew, Saga-Book 31 (2007)

Icelandic manuscripts
Mathematics manuscripts
14th-century books
Old Norse literature